Porritt Stadium (or Porritt Park), is a multi-purpose stadium in the suburb of Chartwell in Hamilton, New Zealand.  It is used for football matches and athletics and is the home stadium of Hamilton Wanderers. The main field is surrounded by a national grade athletics track.

The stadium is named for Arthur Porritt, Baron Porritt.

Porritt Stadium hosted the 2022 New Zealand Special Olympics National Summer Games. It was formerly used in the New Zealand Football Championship as Hamilton's and Waikato’s home ground.

History
In 2015, Porritt Stadium was upgraded and small stands were installed due to it being a training ground for the 2015 FIFA U-20 World Cup.

References

Association football venues in New Zealand
Sports venues in Hamilton, New Zealand